In modern Western tonal music theory an augmented unison or augmented prime is the interval between two notes on the same staff position, or denoted by the same note letter, whose alterations cause them, in ordinary equal temperament, to be one semitone apart. In other words, it is a unison where one note has been altered by a half-step, such as B and B or C and C. The interval is often described as a chromatic semitone. The term, in its French form unisson superflu, appears to have been coined by Jean-Philippe Rameau in 1722, who also called this interval a minor semitone (semiton mineur). Historically, this interval, like the tritone, is described as being "mi contra fa", and therefore is the "diabolus in musica" (the Devil in music). In 12-tone equal temperament, it is the enharmonic equivalent of a diatonic semitone or minor second, although in other tunings the diatonic semitone is a different interval.

Diminished unison

The term diminished unison or diminished prime is also found occasionally. It is found once in Rameau's writings, for example, as well as subsequent French, German, and English sources.
Other sources reject the possibility or utility of the diminished unison on the grounds that any alteration to the unison increases its size, thus augmenting rather than diminishing it. The term is sometimes justified as a negative-numbered interval, and also in terms of violin double-stopping technique on analogy to parallel intervals found on other strings. Some theoreticians make a distinction for this diminished form of the unison, stating it is only valid as a melodic interval, not a harmonic one.

See also 
 False relation
 List of musical intervals
 List of pitch intervals

Notes

References 

Augmented intervals
Unisons